Alexandrovsk-Sakhalinsky District is an administrative district (raion) of Sakhalin Oblast, Russia, one of the seventeen in the oblast. As a municipal division, it is incorporated as Alexandrovsk-Sakhalinsky Urban Okrug. It is located in the west of the oblast. Its administrative center is the town of Alexandrovsk-Sakhalinsky. Population (excluding the administrative center):

References

Notes

Sources

Districts of Sakhalin Oblast